Ivan Žgela (born 24 January 1982) is a Croatian football midfielder, currently playing for German club TSV Röthenbach.

Playing career 
Žgela played in the Croatian First Football League with HNK Cibalia in 2001. During his tenure with Cibalia he participated in the 2003 UEFA Intertoto Cup. In 2006, he played in the Croatian Second Football League with NK Inter Zaprešić. He went abroad in 2007 to play with Grindavík in the 1. deild karla. The following season he returned to Croatia to have stints with Cibalia, and NK Novalja. In 2009, he went overseas to sign with Toronto Croatia in the Canadian Soccer League. Following a short stint in the Bangladesh Football Premier League with Farashganj SC he returned to Toronto for the 2010 season. In 2011, he returned to Europe in order to play in the Treća HNL with NK Bedem Ivankovo.

References

External links
 Iceland career stats - KSÍ

1982 births
Living people
Sportspeople from Vinkovci
Association football midfielders
Croatian footballers
Croatia youth international footballers
Croatia under-21 international footballers
HNK Cibalia players
NK Inter Zaprešić players
Grindavík men's football players
NK Novalja players
Toronto Croatia players
Farashganj SC players
First Football League (Croatia) players
Croatian Football League players
1. deild karla players
Landesliga players
Canadian Soccer League (1998–present) players
Croatian expatriate footballers
Expatriate footballers in Iceland
Croatian expatriate sportspeople in Iceland
Expatriate soccer players in Canada
Croatian expatriate sportspeople in Canada
Expatriate footballers in Germany
Croatian expatriate sportspeople in Germany
Expatriate footballers in Bangladesh